Mustafa Nur-Ul Islam (1 May 1927 – 9 May 2018) was a Bangladeshi academic. In 2011, he was appointed a National Professor of Bangladesh. He was awarded Ekushey Padak in 1981 and Independence Day Award in 2010 by the Government of Bangladesh.
He was the founder director of Bangladesh Shilpakala Academy, the Director General of Bangla Academy and the Chairman of Bangladesh National Museum. In 2011, he was appointed a National Professor. He edited a literary magazine named Sundaram.

Early life
Islam was born on 1 May 1927 to the writer Sadat Ali Akhand and Rabeya Khatun in the village of Chingashpur, adjacent to Mahasthangarh in Bogra District.

Education and career
Islam graduated from the University of Calcutta in 1948 and got his post-graduate degree from the University of Dhaka and PhD from the London University. He started the career in journalism in 1951. In his career, he taught at St. Gregor's and Edward College under University of Rajshahi and Jahangirnagar University. He was the Director General of Bangladesh Shilpakala Academy and Bangla Academy and the Chairman of the Bangladesh National Museum. His published book count is almost half-century. He added special dimensions to the presentation of television shows. As the assistant editor, he was associated with the first issue of The Sangbad. Works Daily Millat.

References

1927 births
2018 deaths
University of Calcutta alumni
University of Dhaka alumni
Alumni of the University of London
Academic staff of Jahangirnagar University
National Professors of Bangladesh
Recipients of the Ekushey Padak
Recipients of the Independence Day Award
People from Bogra District